Glendale is a neighborhood on the West side of Salt Lake City, Utah. Glendale is South of the Rose Park, Fair Park, and Poplar Grove neighborhoods.  The neighborhood was originally developed as Glendale Gardens which is where Glendale Middle School derives its name.  Mountain View Elementary (next to Glendale Middle School) was originally named Glendale Elementary.  
Glendale, and neighboring Poplar Grove, Fair Park, & Rose Park enjoy a vibrant multi ethnic environment.  Residents of Glendale enjoy the community's diversity, friendliness, pride in community, and authenticity of fellow residents.  Those who live in Glendale also cite it as affordable, and conveniently close to local schools, parks, the airport, and downtown Salt Lake City.

Boundaries 
The Glendale neighborhood is the area west of Interstate 15 to the western Salt Lake City boundary.  Glendale's southern edge borders the City of South Salt Lake at SR-201 and extends North to approximately 950 S. North of Glendale is Poplar Grove.  Both neighborhoods make up most of zip code 84104 and are within Salt Lake City Council District 2.

Development

Historical Development

Prior to 1930

Some of the first homesteaders to settle in what is now the Glendale neighborhood were the George Q. Cannon family.
The George Q. and Caroline Cannon House is a Victorian-style brick house at 1354 South and 1000 West and was built in 1876.  There are maps, photography, property descriptions, and paintings documenting the development of this area. On May 31, 1896, the Latter-day Saint Cannon Ward was established by members of the Cannon family, serving the area between 600 West to the west, Redwood Road to the east, Indiana Avenue to the north, and 2700 South to the south. As of December 31, 1900, the Cannon Ward contained 61 families consisting of 331 people, 81 of which were children.

In the 1890s several industries were established near the northeast corner of what is now Glendale (950 S and 600 W), including a brickyard, brewery, biscuit factory, salt works, and soup factory.  In the early 20th century, railroad tracks bisected Salt Lake City.  Industry and rail works isolated residential areas of the west side of Salt Lake City.  The isolation and proximity to industry caused the residential areas to become working-class neighborhoods.  Before the 1930s, Salt Lake City was highly polluted, having hazy air, and the Jordan River was used as a sewage disposal canal, making it a less desirable place to live near.

There are several houses on the east side of the Jordan River on present day California Avenue that were built prior to 1930.

Between 1930 and 1960
Based on aerial photography, a significant amount of residential development occurred in the Glendale neighborhood from 1937 to 1958, which is coincident with the post-World War II expansion. The first major subdivisions built in Glendale were built in the 1940s and early 1950s.  The early subdivisions were part of the Glendale Gardens housing project, built to accommodate a large influx of families moving to Utah for the war effort, associated with the relocation of the Ninth Service Command to Fort Douglas, Utah.

The area south of California Avenue, east of 1200 West, and west of the Jordan River, was developed from 1947 to 1952.  The area north of California Avenue and south of Glendale Drive was also developed at this time.

The main development in the western, industrial part of Glendale was the Utah Ordnance Plant. This area was operated by the Remington Corporation.  In 1941, several buildings were constructed within the Utah Ordnance Plant area for the purpose of producing World War II ammunition.  The Utah Ordnance Plant was in operation from 1942 to 1943 and was in standby from 1944 to 1946.  The area was decommissioned and sold after 1946.

Post 1960
The Glendale area continued to develop to its present status.  Most of the present apartment complexes were built during this time . ISalt Lake County worked with the Utah Division of Parks to establish the Jordan River Parkway during this time.

Level of Development as of 2012
Of the 7601 acres of zoned land within Glendale's boundaries, 7.5% (571 acres) is commercial, 56.7% (4309 acres) is manufacturing/industrial, 28.8% (2189 acres) is special purpose (open space, public land, and agriculture), and 7% (532 acres) is residential.
As of 2010, Glendale has a population of 9962 people living in 2751 houses.

Post-2012 Development
The preliminary West Salt Lake City master plan outlines many improvements for the west side of Salt Lake City, including improvements to the area's entrances, upholding property maintenance standards, improving bicycle access, and improving the appearance of roads in the neighborhoods. Bordering the north extent of the Glendale neighborhood, the 9 Line Trail is a new trail network connecting West Salt Lake City to the rest of the city.

Neighborhood

Glendale is a neighborhood full of diversity. There are more than 25 different languages spoken in Glendale.

Schools
Glendale Middle School
Mountain View Elementary School
Dual Immersion Academy
Parkview Elementary School
Riley Elementary School

Parks
Glendale has 10 parks, totaling about 88 acres:
17th South River Park
Bend-In-The-River
Glendale Circle
Glendale Park
International Peace Gardens
Jordan Park
Jordan River Parkway
Modesto Park
Nelli Jack Park
Weseman Park
Most of Glendale's parks, with the exceptions of Glendale Circle and Nelli Jack parks, are adjacent to the Jordan River.  The International Peace Gardens park was conceived in 1939, dedicated in 1952, and has areas dedicated to 27 different countries.  Jordan Park is West Salt Lake's largest park and hosts the People's Market, a weekly market inspired by Kyle LaMalfa where locals can buy and sell a variety of items.  The Jordan River Parkway connects several west Salt Lake City neighborhoods, and the Jordan River is considered an important asset to many of West Salt Lake's citizens. Glendale also has an 18-hole municipal golf course.

Businesses
Glendale contains several businesses.  Some notable businesses are listed below in the various categories.

Professional Services
Suazo Business Center is a non-profit business resource center committed to the development and empowerment of the Latino/Hispanic and other underserved communities. It assists existing and potential minority entrepreneurs in succeeding and building wealth.

Restaurants
This is not a complete list of restaurants in the area.  Large (interstate) franchise restaurants were excluded for brevity.  Mention on this list should not be considered an endorsement.
Uinta Brewing Company - Also the largest by volume brewery in Utah.
The Soup Kitchen
African Restaurant and Mini-Mart
Hook and Ladder Company
Victor's Tires & Restaurant - Also a tire shop.
Pacific Seas
El Rey Del Pollo
Frank Granato
Shahrazad Restaurant and Market

Retail
Smith's Food and Drug Headquarters
NPS Store
Stone Ground Bakery - This is a bakery, which may also fall under the restaurant category.
Habitat for Humanity Restore- A non-profit retail location
Vintage Flea Market - Collaborative effort of residents to sell vintage goods.  Near the Restore.

Other Attractions
Glendale is home of Sorenson Unity Center, a community resource and gathering place where all cultures are celebrated and welcomed.  The Sorenson Unity Center hosts art exhibits, cultural events, film, and other events.  The center also houses a fitness center for community members. The center also has computer center, a robotics club, a music studio for teens, and a number of other youth programs.  The center also hosts the Unity Gardens, a community garden space.

Glendale also has Seven Peaks (formerly Raging Waters) water park, which has a wave pool and several slides.

Glendale is home to Wasatch Commons, one of the only cohousing projects in Utah.

Glendale also has one of the sites where the movie, "The Sandlot" was filmed.  The site is located between Glenrose Drive and Navajo Street.

Crime 
Based on data from February 1 to August 1, 2012, crime in Glendale is comparable to crime in Rose Park, Poplar Grove, and Liberty Wells neighborhoods, and is significantly lower than crime in the Downtown neighborhood.

References 

Neighborhoods in Salt Lake City